Iolaus mane, the Labe sapphire, is a butterfly in the family Lycaenidae. It is found in Guinea and Ghana.

Etymology
The species is named for the Mane family, several of whose members have collected butterflies in Guinea.

References

Butterflies described in 2003
Iolaus (butterfly)